Gwon Jung-hyeon (November 27, 1854 – March 19, 1934), also spelled Kwon Jung-hyun was an Imperial Korean Lieutenant General and Politician. He was the Minister of Justice from 1899 to 1910 and the Minister of Agriculture, Commerce and Industry from 1905 to 1910. He is best known for being one of the Five Eulsa Traitors who signed the Eulsa Treaty of 1905 which made Korea a protectorate of Japan.

Biography
Gwon was born on November 27, 1854 at Yeongdong. Having learned Japanese from an early age, he joined the Gaehwa Party which was a pro-Japanese political party. In 1883, he became the secretary of the Toei Supervisory Office, and then the secretary in Japan. In 1891 he became the Customs Officer at Incheon and was involved in the signing of the Austria–Korea Treaty of 1892 with Austria-Hungary. As the Minister of Justice, Gwon led the execution of Gwon Hyeong-jin, and Ahn Gyeong-su.

From 1901, he continued to be active in the military field, such as serving as a minister of military affairs. In 1902, he became the headmaster of the Military Academy of Korean Empire and then the head of the army court. At the dawn of the Russo-Japanese War, he was appointed as a greeting agent to greet Itō Hirobumi. In 1904 he was promoted to Lieutenant General of the Imperial Korean Army. Around this time, he also served as director of the president of the Railway Agency. In July 1904, Gwon was sent to Liaoyang, and Lüshunkou District to console Japanese forces with Major Cho Seung-guen, and Captain No Baek-rin. In January 1905, Gwon was appointed as the Minister of Military.

On 26 September 1905, he was appointed as the Minister of Agriculture, Commerce and Industry as a member of Han Kyu-seol's cabinet. On 17 November 1905, Gwon signed the Eulsa Treaty with four other ministers. He used to oppose the signing of treaty, but when Han Kyu-seol was taken away by the Japanese because he also opposed the treaty, Gwon changed his stance and assented the signing. The five bureaucrats, including Gwon Jung-hyeon were shunned as later generations retrospectively title them the Five Eulsa Traitors. He commanded his military units to put down these rebellions. In 1908, he was awarded the Grand Cordon of the Order of the Rising Sun.

When the Japan–Korea Treaty of 1910 was signed, Kwon Jung Hyun was conferred the rank of First Class Viscount on October 16 and was listed among the Korean nobility. In 1912, he received the Korea Annexation Commemorative Medal and was promoted to Senior Fifth Rank .

In 1919, he submitted his resignation and resigned as an advisor to the Central House, but after that he requested the governor-general of Korea, Makoto Saitō, to return, and in 1925 he was appointed as an advisor to the Korean History Compilation Committee. He was reinstated as an advisor to the Central House during the period of Governor-General Hanzō Yamanashi.

Legacy
Gwon's legacy remains heavily controversial among the Korean populace as he was known as a collaborator with the Japanese forces. He was listed in the Korean History Compilation Committee's  along with the other four Five Eulsa Traitors in 2002. In 2007, the  seized his property along with 's property who was his son to the state. In a survey conducted on the lineage of nobility on 1960, his grandson was working at a Antique Art Association.

References

Bibliography
 
 

1854 births
1934 deaths
Traitors in history
People from North Chungcheong Province
Imperial Japanese Army officers
Imperial Korean military personnel
Korean collaborators with Imperial Japan
Lieutenant generals of Korean Empire
Japanese military personnel of the Russo-Japanese War
Recipients of the Order of the Sacred Treasure, 1st class
Grand Cordons of the Order of the Rising Sun
19th-century Korean people
20th-century Korean people
Joseon Kazoku